The Cultural Association of the GDR (KB) was a federation of local clubs in the German Democratic Republic (GDR). It formed part of the Socialist Unity Party-led National Front, and sent representatives to the Volkskammer. The association had numerous writers as its member, including Willi Bredel, Fritz Erpenbeck, Bernhard Kellermann, Victor Klemperer, Anna Seghers, Bodo Uhse, Arnold Zweig. Its first chairman was Johannes Robert Becher.

Wilfried Maaß was the Secretary of Kulturbund 1984–1990. As of 1987, membership stood at 273,000.

Chairmen of the Cultural Association of the GDR

References

East German culture
Cultural organisations based in Germany
Mass organisations of East Germany